Iran and the West a three-part British documentary series shown in February 2009 on BBC Two to mark the 30th anniversary of the Iranian Revolution. The first episode was shown at 9:00pm on Saturday 7 February with parts two and three shown on consecutive Saturdays. The documentary looks at the relationship between Iran and the countries of the west and features interviews with politicians who have played significant roles in events involving Iran, Europe and the United States since 1979.

The series is produced by Norma Percy, whose previous series include The Death of Yugoslavia and Israel and the Arabs: Elusive Peace. Like her previous series, Iran and the West relies extensively on interviews with key players involved in the issue.

It won a Peabody Award in 2009 "for its eminently watchable and historically invaluable examination of one of the world’s most intractable hotspots."

Episodes

See also
 Afghanistan–Iran relations
 Iran–Iraq relations
 Iran–Israel relations
 Iran–United States relations
 Iran–United Kingdom relations

References

External links
 
TV review: Iran and the West (BBC2), The Telegraph, 9 February 2009
The Weekend's Television: A grave new world, The Independent, 9 February 2009

2009 British television series debuts
2009 British television series endings
Documentary films about Iran
Documentary television series about war
Peabody Award-winning television programs
BBC television documentaries about history during the 20th Century
BBC television documentaries about history during the 21st Century